Sleep On It was a band from Chicago, Illinois, United States, formed in 2012. The band consisted of lead vocalist Zech Pluister, lead guitarist and backing vocalist TJ Horansky, Bassist AJ Khah,  rhythm guitarist and backing vocalist Jake Marquis and drummer Luka Fischman. They released 2 studio albums and 3 EPs before ending the band on September 4, 2020.

Career

Sleep On It formed in Logan Square, Chicago, Illinois in the Summer of 2012. The group originally consisted of lead guitarist TJ Horansky, secondary guitarist Jake Marquis, bass guitarist AJ Khah, drummer Luka Fischman, and lead vocalist John Cass. In 2013, the band wrote and recorded their debut EP, Everything, All At Once,  with producer Paul Leavitt at Gravity Studios in downtown Chicago. The EP was independently released on February 11, 2014.

The band released the single, "Bright", on May 23, 2015, as an exclusive premiere on Alternative Press. In an interview with New Noise Magazine, TJ Horansky spoke about the meaning behind "Bright", stating:

The group recorded their second EP, Safe Again, at Valencia Studios in Baltimore, Maryland in early 2015 with Paul Leavitt returning as producer. Leavitt  has recorded with other pop punk bands such as All Time Low and Have Mercy. The six-track EP was independently released on June 18, 2015. After touring in support of the release of the EP, the group announced that lead vocalist John Cass had departed from the band on November 5, 2015. The band continued to write and recorded new material in early 2016 for a new album.

On March 8, 2016, Sleep On it announced that they had recruited a new lead vocalist, former singer for Bonfires, Zech Pluister, and released the single and music video for "Burning at Both Ends". On August 25, 2015, the group formally announced its signing with Equal Vision Records, premiering the single "Unspoken", and announcing their third EP, Lost Along the Way. The band wrote and recorded the EP with producer Seth Henderson and State Champs lead vocalist Derek DiScanio and was later released on October 21, 2016.

The band released their debut studio album, Overexposed, on November 3, 2017.

The band's original bassist, AJ Khah left the band in February 2019. He stated the reason for leaving was to focus on other projects, it was later revealed he left because he was experiencing racism from his other bandmates and was forced out due to Pluister not wanting Khah around.

The group released their second studio album, Pride and Disaster, on September 13, 2019.

Discography
Studio albums

Extended plays
 Everything, All At Once (2014)
 Safe Again (2015)
 Lost Along the Way (Equal Vision, 2016)

Singles
 "Bright" (2015)
 "Burning at Both Ends" (2016)
 "Unspoken" (2016)
 "See You Around" (2016)
 "Distant (2017)
 "Window" (2017)
 "Fireworks" (feat.  Derek DiScanio) (2017)
 "Disconnected" (2018)
"Under the Moment" (2019)
"Hold Your Breath" (2019)
"After Tonight" (2019)

Members
Former members

 TJ Horansky - lead guitar, backing vocals (2012–2020)
 Jake Marquis - rhythm guitar, backing vocals (2012–2020)
 Luka Fischman - drums, percussion (2012–2020)
 AJ Khah - bass (2012–2019)
 Zech Pluister - lead vocals (2016–2020)
 Zach Hir - bass (2019–2020)
 John Cass - vocals (2012–2015)

References

Pop punk groups from Illinois
Musicians from Chicago